Vicente Casares is a village in the Cañuelas Partido of Buenos Aires Province in Argentina.

External links

Populated places in Buenos Aires Province